Irene Fernandez (18 April 1946 – 31 March 2014) was a Malaysian human rights activist and politician. She was a People's Justice Party (KeADILan) supreme council member  and the director and co-founder of the non-governmental organization Tenaganita, which promotes the rights of migrant workers and refugees in Malaysia.

In 1995, Irene Fernandez published a report on the living conditions of the migrant workers
entitled "Abuse, Torture and Dehumanised Conditions of Migrant Workers in Detention Centres". The report was based in part on information given to her by Steven Gan and a team of reporters from The Sun, who had uncovered evidence that 59 inmates, primarily Bangladeshis, had died in the Semenyih immigration detention camp of the preventable diseases typhoid and beriberi. When Gan and his colleagues were blocked by Sun editors from printing the report in the paper, they passed it to Fernandez.

She was arrested in 1996 and charged with 'maliciously publishing false news'. After seven years of trial, she was found guilty in 2003 and convicted to one year's imprisonment. Released on bail pending her appeal, her passport was held by the courts, and as a convicted criminal, she was barred from standing as parliamentary candidate in the 2004 Malaysian elections.

In 2005, she was awarded the Right Livelihood Award for "her outstanding and courageous work to stop violence against women and abuses of migrant and poor workers".

Irene Fernandez's appeal at the High Court resumed on 28 October 2008. On 24 November 2008, Justice Mohamed Apandi Ali overturned her earlier conviction and acquitted her, ending the thirteen-year case.

She died on 31 March 2014 of heart failure.

Election Results

See also
 Illegal immigrants in Malaysia

References

External links 
Tenaganita official site
SUARAM official site
Biography on Right Livelihood Award website
Irene Fernandez defends the rights of migrant workers despite conviction, Amnesty International report

1946 births
2014 deaths
Malaysian people of Indian descent
Malaysian Christians
Malaysian human rights activists
Malaysian women's rights activists
21st-century Malaysian women politicians
People's Justice Party (Malaysia) politicians
20th-century Malaysian women politicians
20th-century Malaysian politicians